Owen Lance Hughes (born 6 July 1971 in Palmerston North) is a New Zealand slalom canoer who competed from the late 1980s to the mid-1990s. He finished 31st in the K-1 event at the 1996 Summer Olympics in Atlanta.

External links
 

1971 births
Canoeists at the 1996 Summer Olympics
Living people
New Zealand male canoeists
Olympic canoeists of New Zealand
Sportspeople from Palmerston North
20th-century New Zealand people